Norwegian Wood may refer to:

 "Norwegian Wood (This Bird Has Flown)", a 1965 song by the Beatles
 Norwegian Wood (novel), a 1987 novel by Haruki Murakami
 Norwegian Wood (film), a 2010 Japanese film based on the novel
 Norwegian Wood (music festival), an annual music festival in Oslo, Norway
 For woodland in Norway, see Geography of Norway#Flora